A list of members of the Løgting from 1998 to 2002. The Løgting had 32 members this period. Before 2008 there were 7 electoral districts: Streymoy island was divided in a southern and northern part, Suðurstreymoy is the part of Streymoy, where Tórshavn, the capital, is located, Norðstreymoy is the northern part of Streymoy, where Vestmanna is the largest village. Eysturoy (the second largest island), Norðoyar (the island group in the north-east part of the Faroes: Kalsoy, Kunoy, Borðoy, Viðoy, Svínoy and Fugloy), Sandoy (including Skúvoy and Stóra Dímun), Suðuroy (the southernmost island) and Vágar (including Mykines).

Regular members 
This list include all elected members of the Løgting. Under "Remarks" the vice members, which took seats in the Løgting instead of the ministers are listed.

External links
Results from the elections from the Løgting
PDF about the history of the Løgting and about the Parliament of 1998-2002

 1998
1998 in the Faroe Islands
1999 in the Faroe Islands
2000 in the Faroe Islands
2001 in the Faroe Islands
2002 in the Faroe Islands
1998–2002